Helcogramma steinitzi, known commonly as the red triplefin, is a species of triplefin blenny in the genus Helcogramma. It was described by Eugenie Clark in 1980. The specific name honours the marine biologist and herpetologist Heinz Steinitz (1909-1971) of the Hebrew University, Jerusalem. This species occurs in the north western Indian Ocean from the Red Sea to the Persian Gulf.

References

Red triplefin
Fish described in 1980
Taxa named by Eugenie Clark